Le Collège français (LCF) is a French-language high school in Toronto, Ontario, Canada part of the Conseil scolaire Viamonde. Prior to 1998, the school was part of the Conseil des écoles françaises de la communauté urbaine de Toronto (CEFCUT) and the Toronto Board of Education (TBE).

General information
Le Collège français is part of le Conseil scolaire Viamonde and  had 283 students enrolled. It is located in downtown Toronto near the intersection of Carlton Street and Jarvis Street, near the TTC College subway station. Around 80% of the school's students commute by public transit. The school offers the IB program.

History
Le Collège français was founded in 1979 within Monarch Park High School as the first French language "module" at the secondary level in Toronto. It was the second French public secondary school established in Toronto (the first was École secondaire Étienne-Brûlé). In 1981, it moved to Jarvis Collegiate Institute, became a separate entity in 1989, and adopted the name Le Collège français à Jarvis in 1992. In September 1997, the school moved into its present building on Carlton Street at Jarvis Street, and became Le Collège français; the building previously had been part of the Canadian Broadcasting Corporation Toronto headquarters until they were moved to their current location at the Canadian Broadcasting Centre in 1993. That being said a rumour amongst the students of Collège Français, states that the school was previously a morgue, and that if you're lucky (or unlucky deppending on how you see it) you can catch a glimpse one of the ghosts or spirits that linger the halls.

Sports
Sports are a large part of CF. The school has a basketball, volleyball, hockey and soccer team.

Notable people of Le Collège français

Alumni
Sam Earle – child actor
Dalmar Abuzeid – child actor
Julia Lalonde - actress

See also
List of high schools in Ontario

References

External links

School profile at the International Baccalaureate Organization web site

1979 establishments in Ontario
Educational institutions established in 1979
College francais
College francais
International Baccalaureate schools in Ontario